Blood Rage (also known as Nightmare at Shadow Woods and Slasher) is a 1987 American slasher film directed by John Grissmer, written by Bruce Rubin, and starring Louise Lasser, Mark Soper, and Julie Gordon. Set on Thanksgiving, the film follows a woman and her adult son who are stalked at their remote apartment community by the son's unhinged twin brother who has escaped from a psychiatric institution after allegedly murdering a man years earlier.

The film features additional performances from producer Kanter, Jayne Bentzen, as well as a cameo appearance by Ted Raimi. Filmed in 1983 in Jacksonville, Florida, it was released theatrically under the title Nightmare at Shadow Woods in 1987 in a censored cut which eliminated much of the film's elaborate gore special effects. It was subsequently released on home video under the title Blood Rage, though the opening credits confusingly identify the film's title as Slasher. The film received a Blu-ray and DVD release by Arrow Films in December 2015, featuring the three varying versions of the film.

Plot
Todd and Terry are identical twin brothers. One night at a drive-in theater in 1974, young Terry sees his mother Maddy and her date begin kissing inside the car. Upset that his mother is "back at it again", he wakes his brother and they sneak out of the car. Apparently triggered by his mother's promiscuity, Terry takes a hatchet and murders a teenager having sex with his girlfriend in the backseat of their car, then frames Todd by smearing blood onto him and placing the hatchet into his hand. Todd, too traumatized to speak in his own defense, is found guilty and committed to an asylum.

Ten years later, in 1984, a now-adult Terry lives happily with his mother in a sprawling but secluded apartment complex named Shadow Woods. On Thanksgiving Day, Terry's long dormant murderous rage is revived when his mother gets engaged to her fiancé Brad, who owns the complex. Terry also learns that twin brother Todd, whom he framed for murder a decade earlier, has escaped from his mental hospital and may be heading home. Terry murders Brad by chopping his right hand off with a machete before splitting his head. He plans on again framing twin brother Todd.

Dr. Berman and her assistant Jackie arrive at Shadow Woods in search of Todd. Terry greets Jackie before murdering him with his machete, and soon after cuts Dr. Berman in half with the machete in the woods. He discards his bloody T-shirt and changes into a vest. He then visits his neighbor Andrea, who is babysitting. Andrea attempts to seduce Terry but he seems uninterested, before her mother Julie and her date Bill arrive home. Meanwhile, Terry's friend Karen bumps into Todd, who has arrived at Shadow Woods, and she believes he is Terry. When Todd reveals his true identity, she flees to tell her friends. She also tells Terry, who immediately disappears into the night in search of his twin brother, while Karen and her friends Gregg and Artie to go to Andrea's house to party.

Upon learning that son Todd has returned to Shadow Woods, Maddy begins to panic and drink heavily. Todd comes across Dr. Berman's body and becomes emotional. He takes Dr. Berman's gun and goes off in search of his mass murdering twin brother. Back at Andrea's, Bill has been decapitated by Terry, who then stabs Julie to death. Terry spies on Gregg and Andrea playing tennis, before he murders both of them by the swimming pool. Artie finds the bodies of Gregg and Andrea, before being held at gunpoint by Todd, who tries to convince him that it is not him but actually his brother Terry who is murdering everyone. Todd flees when Terry sees him, leaving Artie with Terry. As Artie and Terry search for Todd, Artie is suddenly stabbed in the neck with a carving fork.

Karen soon discovers the truth about Terry and Todd, and Terry chases her around Shadow Woods to kill her. Karen flees to Julie's house and discovers her dead body, and takes the baby with her. After a very drunk Maddy contacts the police, she finds Terry's bloodied T-shirt in the garbage bin before making the horrifying discovery of Brad's body with his head split open. At the swimming pool, Terry has found Karen with the baby. Todd arrives and fights his brother inside the pool. As Todd is pulled out of the pool by Karen, Maddy appears and shoots Terry, killing him. She thinks she has killed Todd, not Terry. Upon realizing that she has killed Terry and not Todd, she becomes distraught, while Karen flees with the baby.

As the film concludes, a hysterical Maddy commits suicide by shooting herself in the head while Todd watches. Police sirens are heard in the distance, while Todd's fate is left unknown.

Cast

Production

Filming
Filming of Blood Rage took place in 1983 in Jacksonville, Florida, where producer Marianne Kanter had secured a large number of local film investors. Scenes on the nature trails were shot on the campus of the University of North Florida, while the apartment complex was located in west Jacksonville. Additional filming for the opening drive-in sequence took place in New Jersey.

According to Kanter, the only reason she appeared in the role of Dr. Berman had been because the actress hired to do the role from New York failed to show up. Kanter also noted that the production of the film was rocky, with star Louise Lasser and director John Grissmer not getting along on set. According to Kanter, Grissmer quit during the middle of the shoot, though she was able to get him to agree to return. The film's working title was Complex, though it was re-titled Slasher by Grissmer.

Release
Although the film was shot in 1983, it was given only a limited release theatrically in the United States by the Film Concept Group under the title Nightmare at Shadow Woods in 1987; this cut of the film truncated a considerable amount of the gore special effects.

Alternative versions
Nightmare at Shadow Woods (which was also the cable television title for this film) was heavily edited, abbreviating much of the gore, but it contained a swimming pool scene not found in the 1987 VHS Blood Rage version by Prism Entertainment. The latter contains all of the gore and includes an early scene, missing from the Nightmare at Shadow Woods version, where Maddy visits Todd at the mental hospital.

Home media
The film was released on VHS by Prism Entertainment in 1987 under the title Blood Rage. The Nightmare at Shadow Woods cut of the film had a budget DVD release in 2004 by Legacy Entertainment.
   
Arrow Films released the film on Blu-ray in a 3-disc limited edition Blu-ray and DVD combination set in December 2015, which contained an additional Blu-ray disc featuring the Nightmare at Shadow Woods cut of the film as well as outtakes and a composite cut. A standard two-disc Blu-ray and DVD combination set was released in January 2017.

Reception
Clayton Dillard of Slant Magazine awarded the film four-and-a-half out of five stars, writing: "Funny, brutal, and featuring an above-average amount of T&A, Blood Rage epitomizes the slasher film's sense of transgression, both in terms of bodily awareness and genre play". The Variety Film Reviews guide deemed the film a "trite slasher flick", adding: "Only Lasser, experienced enough to realize the anemic script can only be played for laughs, has any screen presence". Nate Guerra, of the website Bloody Disgusting, felt Mark Soper's performance "can be awkward at times, but Soper does do a great job separating the twin's personalities and portraying two completely different characters". He continued: "He has weird moments, such as putting lots of unnecessary emphasis on lines... His performance is truly based on whether or not he's trying at any given moment. But Soper looks like he's having a great time, and that's what counts for a movie such as this".

The horror movie podcast Watch If You Dare reviews Blood Rage for their annual Thanksgiving episode every year. Their 2021 episode was named after its alternative title Slasher in an effort to trick listeners as a joke.

References

External links
 
 
 
 https://web.archive.org/web/20150402171557/http://www.bloodragethefilm.com/

1987 films
1987 horror films
1983 films
1983 horror films
1980s slasher films
American slasher films
American splatter films
1980s English-language films
Filicide in fiction
Films about dysfunctional families
Films about twin brothers
Films set in 1974
Films set in 1984
Films set in Florida
Films shot in Florida
Films about mass murder
Films scored by Richard Einhorn
Thanksgiving horror films
1980s American films